The Cooma Monaro Railway is a heritage railway museum that is actively restoring the Cooma Railway Precinct while working on the restoration of tourist trains along the section of track on the Bombala line between Cooma and the terminus at Bombala in New South Wales, Australia. Restoration of the track within the yard at Cooma is currently being restored along with the section north to Snowy Junction. 

The Cooma Monaro Railway Museum, including the Travel for Pleasure exhibit will open in December 2022 at Cooma Railway Station with tourist trains expected to return in 2023.

The railway also run a monthly fresh produce market on the second Sunday of the month at Cooma Railway Station.

History
Regular services on the Bombala line ceased south of Queanbeyan with the withdrawal of the Canberra Monaro Express in September 1988. Following a bridge carrying the line over the Numeralla River at Chakola being declared unsafe, freight services south of Queanbeyan ceased in May 1989. However a steam special did operate through to Cooma a few weeks later, albeit without passengers over the bridge in question.

In 1992, the Cooma Monaro Railway was formed with the aim of establishing a tourist railway. It set about negotiating a lease on the Bombala line from Cooma to Chakola with the State Rail Authority. In 1994, it purchased three CPH railmotors 6, 8 and 22 and accompanying trailer CTC55 from the Mountain High Railway, Tumut, and restoration at the former locomotive shed at Cooma commenced. After the line and railmotors were refurbished, operations commenced on 5 December 1998.

Trains ceased operating in January 2014, with major repairs required to the line. In January 2015, 620/720 class railcars 625/725 and 631/731 were purchased from RailCorp. FP Paybus FP11 is also in the collection.

References

Tourist railways in New South Wales
1992 establishments in Australia
Cooma